Brunke is a German surname. Notable people with the surname include:

Adalbert Brunke (1912–2013), German Evangelical-Lutheran prelate
Hans Brunke (1904–1985), German footballer
Timo Brunke (born 1972), German poet

See also
Brunker

German-language surnames